Nia Talita Long (born October 30, 1970) is an American actress. Best known for her work in Black cinema, Long rose to prominence after starring in the film Boyz n the Hood (1991), and for her portrayal of Beullah "Lisa" Wilkes on the NBC sitcom The Fresh Prince of Bel-Air (1991–1995). She then appeared in Friday (1995), as well as the 1997 films Love Jones and Soul Food.

Long is also known for her roles in the films The Best Man (1999), and its sequel The Best Man Holiday (2013), as well as Big Momma's House (2000) and its sequel Big Momma's House 2 (2006). On television, she portrayed Sasha Monroe on the crime drama series Third Watch (2003–2005), and has starred on the Fox drama series Empire (2017), and the CBS action series NCIS: Los Angeles (2017-2018).

She has received several accolades, including two NAACP Image Awards and a Black Reel Award.

Early life
Long was born in Brooklyn, New York City, to Talita Long (née Gillman), a teacher and printmaker, and Doughtry Long, a high school teacher and poet. Her mother is of Trinidadian descent. She has an older half-sister, the actress and comedian known as Sommore. When Long was two years old, her parents divorced. She accompanied her mother who moved to Iowa City, Iowa, to study fine arts. 

When Long was seven, her mother moved to South Los Angeles, as she planned to marry there. She and her fiancé called off the wedding, but Talita chose to stay in Los Angeles. Long's father resided in Trenton, New Jersey. She was bused from South LA to Paseo Del Rey Elementary School in Playa Del Rey from 3rd grade through 6th grade, and attended St. Mary's Academy in Inglewood, California. In addition to her academic classes, she studied ballet, tap, jazz, gymnastics, guitar, and acting. She graduated from Westchester High School in Los Angeles in 1989.

Career
Long's acting coach was Betty Bridges, better known as the mother of Diff'rent Strokes star Todd Bridges. Her earliest role was in the Disney television movie, The B.R.A.T. Patrol alongside Sean Astin, Tim Thomerson and Brian Keith. Her first notable role on television was a three-year contract role as Kathryn "Kat" Speakes on the soap opera Guiding Light. Long portrayed Kat from 1991 to 1994. Long played Brandi in Boyz n the Hood. The film excited Long, who was doing her "first real movie role". It helped Long build her confidence as an actress. "It introduced me to the world in a way that it was okay for me to be who I am and still find success," she added. "I didn’t have to conform to anything." From 1994 to 1995, she played Will Smith's girlfriend and fiancée Beulah "Lisa" Wilkes on The Fresh Prince of Bel-Air. Jada Pinkett Smith was originally supposed to play Lisa, but was too short for the role (opposite a 6'2" Will Smith), thus leaving Long to take the part. Also, in the second season of the show (episode 8 - "She Ain’t Heavy" 1992), Long appeared as Claudia, a love interest of Will's, alongside Queen Latifah. In 2000, Long auditioned for the role of Alex Munday in Charlie's Angels, but did not get the part because she "looked too sophisticated and too old next to Drew Barrymore." The role was eventually given to Lucy Liu. In 2003, Long joined the cast of the drama Third Watch, where she played NYPD Officer Sasha Monroe, continuing until the series finale in 2005. In 2005 and 2006, Long appeared on Everwood, and guest-starred on Boston Legal during its 2006–2007 season. She then starred alongside Michael Vartan and Dylan McDermott in Big Shots from 2007 to 2008. In 2016, Long was cast as Giuliana, a Las Vegas club owner, in a recurring role on the TV series Empire.

Long has acquired supporting roles in a number of movies such as Friday and Made in America. She has also played a leading role, or was a member of the primary ensemble, in several films, including Soul Food, Love Jones, Boiler Room, Big Momma's House, Are We There Yet?, and The Best Man. Ice Cube has starred with her in four films, while (fellow Westchester High alum) Regina King has starred with her in two. Long has also starred alongside Michael Beach in the movie Soul Food and on the TV series Third Watch.

Long made a cameo appearance in the video for Kanye West's "Touch the Sky". She also directed Yolanda Adams's music video for "This Too Shall Pass". Long won a NAACP Image Award for Outstanding Actress in a Drama Series in 2004 for her performance on Third Watch. She co-directed and appeared in Ashanti's music video, "Baby", and made a guest appearance on the sitcom Living Single during its first season. She originally voiced Roberta Tubbs on The Cleveland Show before being replaced by Reagan Gomez-Preston.

Long later appeared in the 2013 film The Best Man Holiday, reprising her role from the original 1999 film. Unlike the original film, however, her character is in an interracial relationship with a white man. After Long was revealed to be pursuing an interracial relationship in the film, she explained: "We're living in a modern world where it happens and it's OK and it's no disrespect to any black man. I love black men, but the reality is the sistahs are marrying white men and the brothas are marrying white women and that's the world that we live in and it's not to be judged, and if it works for you then embrace it". Director Malcolm D. Lee also supported the interracial relationship being portrayed in the film. "African-American women who are extremely successful can't always find black male counterparts on that level so it's a little bit of a reflection of reality that black women are starting to date outside their race — and why not?"

In July 2020, Long starred in the Netflix psychological thriller Fatal Affair. In 2022, Long starred in the Peacock miniseries The Best Man: The Final Chapters, once again reprising her role from the previous films.

Personal life
Long contributes her time to the Sterling Children's Home in Barbados as a motivational speaker.

In 2010, Long started dating former NBA player and former Boston Celtics head coach Ime Udoka. Together, they have a son, born in 2011. Long also  has an older son, born in 2000, from a previous relationship. Long and Udoka became engaged in 2015, though Long stated she has no plans to marry. The couple split in 2022.

Filmography

Film

Television

Music videos

Awards and nominations

References

External links 

 

1970 births
20th-century American actresses
21st-century American actresses
Actresses from Iowa
Actresses from Los Angeles
Actresses from New York City
Actors from Trenton, New Jersey
African-American actresses
American film actresses
American motivational speakers
Women motivational speakers
American television actresses
American voice actresses
American people of Barbadian descent
American people of Grenadian descent
American people of Saint Vincent and the Grenadines descent
American people of Trinidad and Tobago descent
American soap opera actresses
Living people
People from Brooklyn
Actors from Iowa City, Iowa
20th-century African-American women
20th-century African-American people
21st-century African-American women
21st-century African-American people